Luc Faatau (born 1959) is a French Polynesian politician and former Cabinet Minister. He is a member of the Tapura Huiraatira.

Faatau is a former delegate of the Polynesian Society of Authors, Composers and Music Publishers. He served as Minister of Lands in the 2004 cabinet of president Gaston Flosse, and later under Gaston Tong Sang.

In January 2017 he was appointed to the cabinet of Édouard Fritch as Minister of Equipment and Transport. He contested the 2018 French Polynesian legislative election as a candidate for the Tapura Huiraatira. During the campaign he was accused of abusing Ministerial travel for the purposes of campaigning. While not elected, he entered the Assembly of French Polynesia as a replacement for a government Minister after not being reappointed to Cabinet.

References

Living people
1959 births
Government ministers of French Polynesia
Transport ministers of French Polynesia
Members of the Assembly of French Polynesia
Tapura Huiraatira politicians